Have You Been Paying Attention? is an Australian game show which sees host Tom Gleisner quiz five guests on the previous week's news stories. The first season, consisting of 8 episodes, premiered on 3 November 2013 and concluded on 22 December 2013. The second season of 26 episodes premiered on 23 February 2014 and finished on 29 September 2014. The 28 episode third season premiered on 11 May 2015 and concluded on 16 November 2015.

In addition to the regular seasons, one-off Year in Review specials have aired since 2014, which expand on the regular episode format by having guests examined on the top news stories of that year.

Season overview

Episodes

Season 1 (2013)
Note: Winners are listed in bold

Season 2 (2014)
Note: Winners are listed in bold

Season 3 (2015)
Note: Winners are listed in bold

Season 4 (2016)
Note: Winners are listed in bold
The show returned one week after ''MasterChef Australias premiere. The show aired permanently at 8:30pm on Mondays.

Season 5 (2017)
Note: Winners are listed in bold
The show returned one week after MasterChef Australia'''s premiere. The show aired permanently at 8:40pm on Mondays.

Season 6 (2018)
Note: Winners are listed in bold
The show returned one week after MasterChef Australias premiere. The show aired permanently at 8:40pm on Mondays.

Season 7 (2019)
Note: Winners are listed in bold

Season 8 (2020)
Note: Winners are listed in bold

Season 9 (2021)
Note: Winners are listed in bold

Season 10 (2022)
Note: Winners are listed in bold

Specials

Notes

References

Lists of Australian non-fiction television series episodes